Tanis Chalopin (born 10 November 1993) is a French-Singaporean singer, songwriter, composer and musician.

Early life 
Tanis was born on 10 November 1993, in Neuilly-sur-Seine France, to French producer and writer Jean Chalopin and Singaporean former model Ethel Fong. She has one brother, Janvier.

Tanis grew up mostly in France and spent part of her childhood in the Chateau de Farcheville. She began to learn the piano at the age of five and now plays four instruments: piano, cello, guitar and drums. She first gained recognition when, at the age of 14, she wrote the theme to the Disney Asia movie Trail of the Panda (2009). Tanis went on to study at the New York University Steinhardt School Department of Music and Performing Arts.

In September 2016 Tanis gave a TED talk on visualizing music for TEDxBeaconStreet.

Music career 
Tanis launched her career as a singer songwriter in 2015 with the single "Ce n'est pas moi": the song features on the soundtrack of the 2017 film Thoroughbreds This was followed in 2016 with her second single "Losing my mind".

The 2016 single "Blackout", from the EP of the same name, saw three separate versions (English, French and remix) each achieve over half a million views within the first month of release. The single was remixed by French DJ and musician The Toxic Avenger.

In 2017, Tanis composed and produced the music for the C4 production short film Killing Hope. She released the single "Would Be You" on 19 April 2019. The video was created with videographer Andre Musgrove, editor Max Grey and makeup and hair artist Bri Trishitta.

Tanis composed the track "Twin Flame" as a wedding present for Princess Eugenie and Jack Brooksbank. It was performed by the Royal Philharmonic Orchestra at their wedding in 2018.

Discography 

 "Ce n'est pas moi", 2015. 
 "Losing My Mind", 2016
 "Blackout", 2016
 "Drive", 2016
 "Child in the Empty Forest", 2016
 "Would Be You", 2019

See also

References

External links

1993 births
Living people
21st-century women musicians
French women singer-songwriters
French singer-songwriters
People from Nanterre
French people of Singaporean descent
Steinhardt School of Culture, Education, and Human Development alumni